Ratton may refer to:

People
 A member of the Franco-Portuguese family of industrialists, of which the most notable include
 Jácome Ratton (1736-1820), Franco-Portuguese merchant and mill-owner
 Daisy Burrell (1892-1982), English actress, real name Daisy Ratton

Other
 Ratton Estate, now part of Hampden Park, Eastbourne
 Ratton School in Eastbourne, England